Turki bin Abdullah Al Saud (born 21 October 1971) is the seventh son of King Abdullah of Saudi Arabia. He served as deputy governor and then, governor of Riyadh Province from 2013 to 29 January 2015. He was one of the 11 princes detained in November 2017 by Mohammad bin Salman as a part of his anti-corruption drive on accusations of corruption in the Riyadh Metro project and taking advantage of his influence to award contracts to his own companies. As of June 2021 he was still in detention.

Early life and education
Turki bin Abdullah was born on 21 October 1971. He is the seventh son of King Abdullah. His mother is Tathi bint Mishan Al Faisal Al Jarba, a member of the Iraqi branch of the Shammar tribe. He has six blood siblings, including Prince Mishaal and Princess Oraib, wife of Salman bin Abdulaziz bin Salman who has been in detention since early 2018 together with his father.

Prince Turki began his higher education at King Faisal Air Academy. Then he went to the United States to continue his education, and trained at Lackland Air Force Base in Texas. He was also trained at King Fahd Air Base in Taif. Then he attended a course of command and staff at Joint Command College in the United Kingdom and received a master's degree in military science. He also holds a master's degree in strategic studies, which he obtained from the University of Wales. As of 2013 Prince Turki was a PhD candidate in international strategic studies at the University of Leeds.

Career
Turki bin Abdullah was a military officer and an F-15 pilot at the Royal Saudi Air Force. In October 1997 he was promoted to the rank of captain pilot. Then he was promoted to the rank of colonel. In July 2006 Prince Turki was decorated with the rank of lieutenant colonel pilot. Then Prince Turki worked at King Abdulaziz Air Base in Dhahran as the commander of Squadron 92, 3rd air wing with a rank of group captain. In 2010 Prince Turki began to serve as the commander of the Red Flag-4 exercise group.

In addition, Prince Turki was the head of the board of directors of the Saudi Equestrian Fund. He also has several business investments in Saudi Arabia, including an aviation company named Al Obayya Corp.

Prince Turki was appointed deputy governor of the Riyadh province on 14 February 2013, replacing Muhammad bin Saad in the post. Therefore, he became deputy of the governor, Khalid bin Bandar, who was also appointed the same day. On 14 May 2014 he was appointed governor of Riyadh at rank of minister. Prince Turki's term as governor ended on 29 January 2015 when Faisal bin Bandar Al Saud was appointed to the post.

Controversy
In 2005 Prince Turki bin Abdullah co-founded the PetroSaudi, a private oil company. The company grew from drilling and oilfield management into trading, opening offices in London's Mayfair district with pictures of Saudi royalty and decked with national flags. The company is embroiled in the 1Malaysia Development Berhad scandal. Prince Turki bin Abdullah is claimed to be the Saudi royal who gifted Malaysian Prime Minister Najib Razak $700 million.

Arrest
  
On 4 November 2017 Turki bin Abdullah Al Saud was detained on accusations of corruption in the Riyadh Metro project and taking advantage of his influence to award contracts to his own companies in a "corruption crackdown" conducted by a new royal anti-corruption committee in Saudi Arabia.

As of September 2020 Prince Turki was still in captivity.

Achievements
Prince Turki was one of the key characters for Riyadh's metro creation.

Prince Turki was an active member of King Abdulaziz Foundation, as well as Prince Muhammed bin Abdulaziz Hospital in Riyadh. He assisted in the "intellectual security" inauguration ceremony alongside the Committee for the Promotion of Virtue and Prevention of Vice.

Personal life
Prince Turki was the son-in-law of Prince Khalid bin Sultan. He married Hala bint Khalid on 14 January 2010. They have a daughter.

References

External links

Turki
Turki
Turki
1971 births
Alumni of the University of Wales
Turki
Turki
Living people
Turki
Turki
Saudi Arabian people of Iraqi descent
Saudi Arabian prisoners and detainees
Turki